Depressaria beckmanni is a moth of the family Depressariidae. It is found in Portugal, Spain, France, Germany, the Czech Republic, Slovakia, Austria, Switzerland, Italy, Finland, Serbia and Montenegro, Albania, North Macedonia and Greece.

The wingspan is 18–22 mm.

The larvae feed on the leaves of Pimpinella major.

References

External links
lepiforum.de

Moths described in 1870
Depressaria
Moths of Europe